Hypostomus varimaculosus is a species of catfish in the family Loricariidae. It is native to South America, where it occurs in the upper Japurá River basin in Brazil and Colombia. The species reaches 6 cm (2.4 inches) in standard length and is believed to be a facultative air-breather.

References 

varimaculosus
Fish described in 1945